Khoiniki is a town in Gomel Region, Belarus. It serves as the administrative center of Khoiniki District

In 1986, the area around Khoiniki experienced heavy radioactive fallout from the Chernobyl accident; however, the city itself was not significantly affected. Today, the town hosts the headquarters of Polesie State Radioecological Reserve and employs over 700 people. The reserve itself is located south of the town in a heavily contaminated area.

History
According to historical records, Khoiniki was first mentioned in 1504 as a dependency in the Grand Duchy of Lithuania. It was incorporated into the Russian Empire in 1793, on the occasion of the Second Partition of Poland. 

In 1897, the city, located in the Zone of Mandatory Residence of Jewish Subjects of the Russian Empire, had a strong community of 1,668 people (62% of the total population).

In 1919, Khoiniki was attached to the Russian Soviet Federative Socialist Republic, then transferred in 1927 to the Byelorussian Soviet Socialist Republic. Khoiniki was occupied by Nazi Germany from August 25, 1941, to November 23, 1943. City status was granted to it on November 10, 1967. It was seriously affected in 1986 by the Chernobyl disaster.

References

Towns in Belarus
Populated places in Gomel Region
Populated places established in 1512
Kiev Voivodeship
Rechitsky Uyezd
Khoiniki District